Walker is an unincorporated community in Macon County, in the U.S. state of Illinois.

History
A post office called Walker was established in 1881, and remained in operation until 1940. The community has the name of  J. W. Walker.

References

Unincorporated communities in Macon County, Illinois